Josef Hauser (10 March 1910 – 10 August 1981) was a German water polo player who competed in the 1936 Summer Olympics.

He was part of the German team which won the silver medal. He played all seven matches.

See also
 List of Olympic medalists in water polo (men)

External links
 

1910 births
1981 deaths
German male water polo players
Water polo players at the 1936 Summer Olympics
Olympic water polo players of Germany
Olympic silver medalists for Germany
Olympic medalists in water polo
Medalists at the 1936 Summer Olympics